Martin Pařízek (born 30 December 1974) is a retired footballer, who played as a goalkeeper.

Club career
Born in Zlín, Pařízek began playing youth football with FC Boby Brno. He joined the club's professional squad, and appeared in ten Czech First League matches in five years at the club. While playing a home match on loan at Benešov, Pařízek was left unconscious following approximately 100 Sparta Prague fans invading the pitch on 4 March 1995.

He moved to Drnovice in 1998, where he spent three seasons in the First League, before moving on loan to Olomouc for a season.

Pařízek moved to Greece in July 2002, initially joining Greek first division side Ionikos F.C. and making 16 league appearances in two seasons. He later played on loan in the Greek second division with Niki Volos F.C., before moving to Iran for a brief spell with Saba Battery.

Pařízek returned to his native Czech Republic at the age of 31, joining Czech 2. Liga side Kunovice in January 2006. This signalled a return to working with manager Oldřich Machala, who Pařízek had played with during his previous spell at Olomouc. In 2010 Pařízek was operating as a member of the Referees Commission in the Czech Republic.

References

External links

1974 births
Living people
Czech footballers
Czech Republic under-21 international footballers
Association football goalkeepers
Czech First League players
FC Zbrojovka Brno players
SK Benešov players
FK Drnovice players
SK Sigma Olomouc players
Ionikos F.C. players
Niki Volos F.C. players
Expatriate footballers in Greece
Expatriate footballers in Iran
Czech expatriate footballers
Sportspeople from Zlín